Sophia Wellbeloved was born in Dublin, Ireland, and is an historian of Western Esotericism, with special reference to 1920s and 1930s Paris, focusing on the life and writings of G. I. Gurdjieff (1866? – 1949).

Education 
She received her education at Newtown Quaker School, Ireland, 1951-55; Beechlawn Tutorial College, Oxford, 1955-56; Ruskin School of Art, Oxford, 1955-56; Saint Martin's School of Art, London, 1956-60; Central School of Art and Design, London, 1961; King's College, London, Ph.D. 1996–99. She has identified her tutors and influences as Cecil Collins, 1960-61; Henriette Lannes, Maurice Deselle, Henri Tracol, and others in the Gurdjieff Society, London, 1962–75; the Rev. Donald Reeves and the Anglican community at St. James Church, Piccadilly, 1984-2004.

Awarded a PhD at King's College, London in 1999.

Work 
From 1984 to 1991, she worked as a part-time tutor teaching sculpture at Central Saint Martins.

Exhibitions (1980–92): Royal Festival Hall, Bath Festival, Henley Festival, Royal Institute of British Architects; Domenga Gallery, Basle, Switzerland, and at Art Fairs in Basle, London, and Los Angeles.

Wellbeloved was a member of the Gurdjieff Society in London between 1962 and 1975.

Wellbeloved is the author of research papers and books relating to Gurdjieff, these include Gurdjieff, Astrology & Beelzebub’s Tales (Solar Bound, 2002) and Gurdjieff: The Key Concepts (Routledge, 2003). George Adams reviewing  Gurdjieff: The Key Concepts suggests that "given the generally unsystematic and occasionally chaotic nature of Gurdjieff's teachings, Wellbeloved's book serves as a very useful introduction to Gurdjieff, offering an orienting structure that is not found in Gurdjieff's published works."

She was the Director of Lighthouse Editions, 2005 – 2012, which published books related to Gurdjieff, and a co-founder in 2006 of the Cambridge Centre for the Study of Esotericism.

Works

 Gurdjieff, Astrology & Beelzeub's Tales, Solar Bound, New Palz, N.Y., 2002
 Gurdjieff: The Key Concepts, Routledge, London and New York, 2003
 48 Trojan Herrings & Tripidium, Waterloo Press, Hove, 2008
 Praying for Flow, Waterloo Press, Hove, 2011

References

External links
 gurdjieffbooks.wordpress.com (for news, reviews, and events related to G. I. Gurdjieff)
 ccwe.wordpress.com (for the Cambridge Centre for the study of Western Esotericism)
 sophiawellbelovedpoetry.wordpress.com (for poetry)

1940 births
Fourth Way
Irish women artists
Living people
Writers from Dublin (city)
Alumni of King's College London
Alumni of Saint Martin's School of Art
Alumni of the Central School of Art and Design
Western esotericism scholars